Chand Burke (2 February 1932 – 28 December 2008), also known as Chand Burque, was an Indian character actress in Hindi and Punjabi language films. She was the paternal grandmother of Bollywood actor Ranveer Singh.

Career
Chand Burke made her debut in Maheshwari Productions’ Kahan Gaye (1946). Chand appeared in a number of films made in Lahore, and was widely known as “the Dancing Lily of the Punjab.” The Partition of India led to her migration to Mumbai (then Bombay) thus adversely affecting her career.

She was given her first break in Bollywood by the veteran actor Raj Kapoor in the award-winning film titled, Boot Polish (1954), where she played the pivotal role of Baby Naaz & Rattan Kumar's tormenting aunt.

Personal life
Burke was born in a Christian family of twelve brothers and sisters in the Punjab Province of British India (in what is now Pakistan). Her brother, Samuel Martin Burke, was Indian Civil Service officer who later became a diplomat to the Scandinavian countries for Pakistan. After divorcing her film writer-director husband Niranjan in 1954, she married businessman Sundar Singh Bhavnani in 1955 with whom she had a daughter named Tonya and a son named Jagjit, who is the father of Bollywood film-star Ranveer Singh.

Filmography

References

External links
 

Indian film actresses
Actresses in Hindi cinema
20th-century Indian actresses